The 2012 Tour de Langkawi was the 17th edition of the Tour de Langkawi, a cycling stage race that takes place in Malaysia. The race consisted of ten stages, starting in Putrajaya on 24 February briefly heading south along the west coast of the Peninsular Malaysia before returning north and crossing eastward to finish in Kuala Terengganu on 4 March.

The tour opened with an individual time trial (ITT), and again featured a stage finish at Genting Highlands. The final stage included five circuits around Kuala Terengganu. The seven other stages were flat or undulating.

Stage 1
24 February 2012 — Putrajaya, Individual time trial

Stage 2
25 February 2012 — Putrajaya to Melaka,

Stage 3
26 February 2012 — Melaka to Parit Sulong,

Stage 4
27 February 2012 — Batu Pahat to Muar, 

There will be no climbs in the stage with only three intermediate sprints (64.1 km, 84.5 km and 115.5 km) for the day. Like in the previous stage, undulating terrain close to the second intermediate sprint zone, will allow attacks from breakaway riders. A gradual descent after the third intermediate sprint.

Stage 5
28 February 2012 — Ayer Keroh to Pandan Indah, 

General classification leader David Zabriskie finished 19 minutes after stage winner José Serpa. His race director suspected fever, heat stroke, or dehydration caused Zabriskie to drop off the back.

Stage 6
29 February 2012 — Proton, Shah Alam to Genting Highlands, 

The Queen stage of the Tour. There were three intermediate sprints in the first 60 km stretch, starting at the 35 km mark. The stage finished at the top of the Hors category climb up to Genting Highlands. Lapthorne was suffering from severe chest pains and was unable to match the pace of the leaders up the final climb, eventually finishing over 15 minutes behind Serpa.

Stage 7
1 March 2012 — Bentong to Kuantan, 

This stage is the longest stage of the Tour this year. Three intermediate sprints starting from Mentakab (57.7 km), Maran (117.3 km) and Gambang (164 km) while there is a Category Four climb at 95.5 km.

Stage 8
2 March 2012 — Pekan to Chukai,

Stage 9
3 March 2012 — Kemasik to Kuala Terengganu, 

Andrea Guardini won his fifth stage of the 2012 Tour de Langkawi. He is the first cyclist to record ten stage victories in the history of the Tour de Langkawi.

Stage 10
4 March 2012 — Kenyir Lake to Kuala Terengganu, Criterium

References

External links

Tour de Langkawi
Tour de Langkawi